Terry Stephens (born 5 November 1935) is a Welsh former footballer, who played as an inside forward in the Football League for Tranmere Rovers.

References

1935 births
Living people
Tranmere Rovers F.C. players
Everton F.C. players
Ellesmere Port Town F.C. players
Association football inside forwards
English Football League players
Welsh footballers
Footballers from Neath